Warrensville (formerly known as Buffalo Creek) is an unincorporated community at the intersection of North Carolina Highways 88 and 194 in Ashe County, North Carolina, United States, east of Comet. It lies at an elevation of 2,707 feet (825 m).  The ZIP Code for Warrensville is 28693.

References

Unincorporated communities in Ashe County, North Carolina
Unincorporated communities in North Carolina